= A'YoY =

Polish independent movie studio

A'YoY is Polish independent movie studio related with Zielonogórskie Zagłębie Kabaretowe, established in 1994 by Kabaret Potem (Cabaret Potem). A'YoY ended its activity in 2006.

A'YoY used to make short movies, but the biggest popularity acquired its feature comedy Baśń o ludziach stąd.

== Notable movies made by A'YoY ==
- Robin Hood - czwarta strzała (1997)
- Dr Jekyll i Mr Hyde według Wytwórni A'YoY (1999)
- Nakręceni (2002)
- Baśń o ludziach stąd (2003)
